The Inchindown oil tanks is a disused underground oil depot in Invergordon, Ross-shire, Scotland. The tanks hold the record for the longest reverberation in any man-made structure, surpassing the Hamilton Mausoleum in 2014.

History

The secret site was officially called "Inchindown, Royal Navy Fuel Tanks" and also known as the "Invergordon Oil Fuel Depot". Work on the tanks began in 1938 and was completed in 1941. They were built to be a bomb-proof supply of furnace fuel oil to the Royal Navy's base at Invergordon.

In 2014, the tanks were designated as a Category A listed building.

Reverberation record
In 2009, guided tours of the tanks were offered by Forestry Commission Scotland. After the tours were mentioned on BBC television programme The One Show, professor of acoustic engineering at the University of Salford Trevor Cox was motivated to perform reverberation tests in the underground tanks.  In 2014 Allan Kilpatrick from the Royal Commission on the Ancient and Historical Monuments of Scotland fired a pistol blank inside one of the tanks. The sound was recorded by Cox, and is reported to have reverberated for 112 seconds at 125 hertz, 30 seconds at mid frequency, and 75 seconds broadband.

In popular culture
In February 2019, photographers Simon Riddell and David Allen recorded a feature-length documentary inside the Inchindown oil facility. This documentary contains the only comprehensive tour of the facility. As part of the documentary, the photographers used a large format camera to make one negative of the first tank. They then slept overnight in tunnel 2, which they turned into a darkroom the next day. They continued to create a darkroom print of their negative on location without leaving the underground facility. The film won 'best documentary with the UK Monthly Film Festival.
The Inchindown oil depot was featured in the "Swamp of Despair" episode of the Science Channel's TV series Mysteries of the Abandoned (season 6, episode 2), first cablecast on April 2, 2020.
 Susan Calman  in the third series of the travel program, Secret Scotland went inside a fuel storage tank.
 Watch the Sound With Mark Ronson'''s episode on reverb goes to the Inchindown Oil Tanks.
 Tom Scott and Matt Gray'' both made videos of the oil tank, amassing 4.4 million views combined.

References

External links

Buildings and structures in Scotland
Category A listed buildings in Highland (council area)
Buildings and structures completed in 1941
Royal Navy bases in Scotland
Subterranea of the United Kingdom
Ross and Cromarty